Husref Musemić (born 4 July 1961) is a Bosnian professional football manager and former player who is the manager of Bosnian Premier League club Igman Konjic. He is regarded as one of the most successful Bosnian football managers.

Club career
Born in the town of Janja, near Bijeljina, SR Bosnia and Herzegovina, SFR Yugoslavia, Musemić began his career playing in local club Radnik Bijeljina, competing back then in the Yugoslav Second League group West. In 1979, he joined Yugoslav First League side FK Sarajevo, where he played the following 6 seasons. He was an important member of the memorable Sarajevo squad that won the 1984–85 Yugoslav First League, which gave him a ticket to a move in that summer to Red Star Belgrade.

In Belgrade Musemić represented the red & white's for the following four seasons, having in the meantime won another Yugoslav First League title in the 1987–88 season. He moved abroad in summer of 1989 by joining Hearts, but he only played the first half of the 1989–90 Scottish Premier Division, as during the winter break he returned to Yugoslavia and joined his former club, FK Sarajevo. He did score a derby winner against Hibernian in August 1989, though, to cement his place in Hearts' history books.

By then, Sarajevo had already been deconstructed from the championship winning squad from 1985, so a year after returning from Scotland, Musemić moved abroad again, this time to the Netherlands by joining Twente. He played nine games in the second half of the 1990–91 Eredivisie season, but in the following season he only managed to play one match, so he spent the second part of the season playing with FC VVV. He however played no official games for them.

Before retiring, Musemić played in Germany between 1992 and 1994 with SC Pfullendorf in the Oberliga Baden-Württemberg where he got the chance to show his scoring skills by netting 16 times in 32 matches. He finished his playing career after the end of that season at the age of 33.

International career
Musemić made his debut and played his only match for the Yugoslav national team in a friendly match played in Timișoara, Romania, on 30 March 1983, in a Yugoslav victory of 2–0 against Romania.

Later, after the break-up of Yugoslavia, in 1995, he played in the first half of the first ever official match of the Bosnia and Herzegovina national team, away against Albania.

Managerial career

Early career
After retiring from playing, Musemić began his managerial career. Initially, he worked at Sarajevo as an assistant to managers Mehmed Janjoš and Nermin Hadžiahmetović. Afterwards managed Đerzelez in the late 1990s, before becoming Sarajevo's main manager and winning the 2004–05 Bosnian Cup and two years later, the 2006–07 Bosnian Premier League.

After Sarajevo, Musemić managed Olimpik, with whom he won the 2008–09 First League of FBiH and got them promoted to the Bosnian Premier League. He also managed Sloboda Tuzla and Mladost Doboj Kakanj. While at Sloboda, Musemić also had good success, finishing 2nd in the 2015–16 Premier League season and being the 2015–16 Bosnian Cup runner-up.

In between his two appointments at Olimpik, from 29 June 2011 until 2012, he was head coach of the Bosnia and Herzegovina U18 national team.

Sarajevo
In August 2017, for the fifth time in his career, Musemić was appointed as the manager of Sarajevo. In November 2017, he overtook Miroslav Brozović as Sarajevo's manager with the most wins in the club's history. In the 2018–19 season, he had for a second time in his career won the Bosnian Cup after Sarajevo beat Široki Brijeg in the final on 15 May 2019.

Just three days after the cup success, on 18 May 2019, Musemić led Sarajevo to a 4–0 home league win against Zvijezda 09 and won the league title with Sarajevo once again and also won the club's first ever double in history, as well as also the first double ever in his managerial career. On 23 May 2019, he was named the Bosnian Premier League Manager of the 2018–19 season. On 12 June 2019, he extended his contract with Sarajevo, which was due to keep him at the club until the summer of 2021.

On 2 December 2019, Musemić got sacked from his position of Sarajevo manager after an underwhelming performance of his team in its 3–1 home league loss against fierce city rivals Željezničar in the Sarajevo derby two days earlier, on 30 November. It was that same season in which Željezničar also beat Sarajevo 5–2 at home on the Grbavica Stadium on 31 August 2019, with Musemić getting most of the blame for the team's loss.

Tuzla City
On 7 January 2021, it was announced that Musemić had become the new manager of Tuzla City, signing a two-and-a-half year contract with the club. In his first game in charge, Tuzla City beat city rivals Sloboda in a league match on 28 February 2021.

Musemić oversaw his first loss as Tuzla City manager against his former Sarajevo, in a semi-final cup game on 7 April 2021. He left the club by mutual consent on 10 April 2022, following a string of poor results.

Igman Konjic
On 22 December 2022, Musemić was appointed as the manager of relegation threatened Igman Konjic. He was victorious in his first match in charge, as Igman won 3–1 against Željezničar on 25 February 2023.

Musemić suffered his first defeat on 11 March 2023, losing 3–0 at home in a match against Zrinjski Mostar.

Personal life
Musemić's older brother Vahidin is a former professional footballer as well and Sarajevo legend.

Managerial statistics

Honours

Player
Sarajevo
Yugoslav First League: 1984–85

Red Star Belgrade
Yugoslav First League: 1987–88

Manager
Sarajevo
Bosnian Premier League: 2006–07, 2018–19
Bosnian Cup: 2004–05, 2018–19

Olimpik
First League of FBiH: 2008–09

Individual
Bosnian Premier League Manager of the Season: 2018–19

References

External links

1961 births
Living people
People from Janja
Bosniaks of Bosnia and Herzegovina
Association football forwards
Yugoslav footballers
Yugoslavia international footballers
Bosnia and Herzegovina footballers
Bosnia and Herzegovina international footballers
Dual internationalists (football)
FK Radnik Bijeljina players
FK Sarajevo players
Red Star Belgrade footballers
Heart of Midlothian F.C. players
FC Twente players
VVV-Venlo players
SC Pfullendorf players
Yugoslav Second League players
Yugoslav First League players
Scottish Football League players
Eredivisie players
Oberliga (football) players
Yugoslav expatriate footballers
Expatriate footballers in Scotland
Yugoslav expatriate sportspeople in Scotland
Expatriate footballers in the Netherlands
Yugoslav expatriate sportspeople in the Netherlands
Bosnia and Herzegovina expatriate footballers
Expatriate footballers in Germany
Bosnia and Herzegovina expatriate sportspeople in Germany
Bosnia and Herzegovina football managers
FK Sarajevo managers
NK Čelik Zenica managers
FK Olimpik managers
FK Sloboda Tuzla managers
FK Mladost Doboj Kakanj managers
FK Tuzla City managers
FK Igman Konjic managers
Premier League of Bosnia and Herzegovina managers